Diego de Almagro is a Chilean city and commune in Chañaral Province, Atacama Region. The area is named after Diego de Almagro. Until 1977, the city was named Pueblo Hundido ("Sunk Town").

Demographics
According to the 2002 census of the National Statistics Institute, Diego de Almagro had 18,589 inhabitants (10,031 men and 8,558 women). Of these, 17,674 (95.1%) lived in urban areas and 915 (4.9%) in rural areas. The population fell by 32.4-32.4% (8926 persons) between the 1992 and 2002 censuses.

Administration
As a commune, Diego de Almagro is a third-level administrative division of Chile administered by a municipal council, headed by an alcalde who is directly elected every four years. The 2008-2012 alcalde is Isaias Zavala Torres. The council has the following members:
 Egidio Masias Herrera
 Maria Torrejon Rojas
 Yerko Guerra Rivera
 Hector Zamora Garcia
 Eliecer Gaytan Pizarro
 Mario Araya Rojas

Within the electoral divisions of Chile, Diego de Almagro is represented in the Chamber of Deputies by Lautaro Carmona (PC) and Carlos Vilches (UDI) as part of the 5th electoral district, (together with Chañaral and Copiapó). The commune is represented in the Senate by Isabel Allende Bussi (PS) and Baldo Prokurica Prokurica (RN) as part of the 3rd senatorial constituency (Atacama Region).

References

Communes of Chile
Populated places in Chañaral Province